Bruce F. Dammeier (born 1961) is an American politician and engineer serving as the executive of Pierce County, Washington. A member of the Republican Party, he previously served as a member of both chambers of the Washington State Legislature.

Early life and education 
Dammeier was born in Tacoma, Washington. He graduated with distinction from the United States Naval Academy, receiving a Bachelor of Science degree in ocean engineering. He received his Master of Science degree in engineering from the University of Washington.

Career 
Dammeier was elected to the Washington State Senate in 2012. He formerly served in the Washington House of Representatives, representing the 25th district from 2009 to 2013. During the 2011 legislative session, Dammeier served on the House Education Committee (ranking member), House Education Appropriations & Oversight Committee (assistant ranking member), and House Ways & Means Committee (assistant ranking member).

Prior to his election to the Washington State House, Dammeier served two terms on the Puyallup, Washington School Board. Since his election in 2016, Dammeier is the Pierce County Executive. He won re-election in 2020 against former State Representative Larry Seaquist by a 10% margin.

References

External links 
 Rep. Dammeier's legislative page
 Bruce Dammeier personal page
 25th Legislative District
 Bruce Dammeier on Facebook

1961 births
Living people
Republican Party members of the Washington House of Representatives
People from Pierce County, Washington
United States Naval Academy alumni
University of Washington College of Engineering alumni
Republican Party Washington (state) state senators
21st-century American politicians